The 2011 Tandridge District Council election took place on 5 May 2011 to elect members of Tandridge District Council in Surrey, England. One third of the council was up for election and the Conservative Party stayed in overall control of the council.

After the election, the composition of the council was:
Conservative 34
Liberal Democrat 6
Independent 2

Background
Before the election the Conservatives controlled the council with 33 councillors, compared to 7 Liberal Democrats and 2 independents. In 2010 councillor Lisa Bangs had left the Liberal Democrats, in protest against the party's decision to enter a coalition with the Conservatives nationally. Bangs would defend her seat in Lingfield and Crowhurst as an independent against a UK Independence Party opponent. The other independent councillor, Bob David, meanwhile held his seat in Tatsfield and Tisley without opposition.

Election result
The Conservatives increased their majority on the council after gaining one seat from the Liberal Democrats in Warlingham East, Chelsham & Farleigh by a 164-vote majority. This meant the Conservatives won 10 of the 14 seats contested, taking the Conservatives to 34 councillors and reducing the Liberal Democrats to 6. The Liberal Democrats held 2 seats, with group leader Chris Botten holding his seat in Portley by 37 votes and Jill Caudle retained the other seat in Valley with a reduced majority. Meanwhile, independents remained on 2 seats, as former Liberal Democrat Lisa Bangs kept Lingfield and Crowhurst with an increased 1,182 votes. Overall turnout at the election was 48.62%.

At the same time as the election Tandridge voted 72% no in the 2011 Alternative Vote referendum.

Ward results

References

2011
2011 English local elections
2010s in Surrey